"K-Jee" is a 1971 song  by American soul and funk band The Nite-Liters. Written by Harvey Fuqua and Charlie Hearndon it charted in 1971 at No. 17 on the US Billboard R&B chart, and at No. 39 on the Billboard Hot 100.

Charts

Cover versions
In 1975, MFSB covered the song on their Universal Love album, charting at No. 18 on the Disco File Top 20 chart. This version was used briefly in the 1977 film Saturday Night Fever and was featured on the accompanying soundtrack.

Use in other media
The instrumental has also appeared as a theme for newscasts presented on KMSP-TV in Minneapolis/St. Paul, Minnesota, WKAB in Montgomery, Alabama, and WMAR-TV in Baltimore, Maryland. It also used for Today In Chicago on WMAQ-TV in Chicago. It was also used by WTVM in Columbus, GA as the opening theme for their Action 9 News broadcast in the late 70s.

References

1971 singles
1975 singles
New Birth (band) songs
MFSB songs
Songs from Saturday Night Fever
Songs written by Harvey Fuqua
Song recordings produced by Harvey Fuqua
1971 songs
RCA Records singles